Panchavan Madeviyar Pallippadai Temple (Panchavanmadeviswaram) is a Pallippadai temple located at Pazhayarai village near Kumbakonam, Thanjavur District, Tamilnadu, India. This Pallippadai temple was built by Rajendra Chola for his step mother Panchavan Madeviyar

History 
Panchavan Madeviyar is one of the many wives of Rajaraja the Great. After her death, her step son, Rajendra Chola rested her ashes in a urn here (which the model can still seen above the lingam) & built a Shiva temple on top of it. This temple was at bad state till 1978 when the Tamil Nadu Archaeology Department renovated the temple.

References 

Chola Empire
Chola architecture
Temples in India